Zonder Ernst is a sitcom made for and aired in the 1990s by Dutch broadcasting organization NCRV.

Plot
The series centers around widow Jet Valkenburg (Sjoukje Hooymaayer) who lives in one house with her mother
Frederique Asselberg (Ellen Vogel) and her daughter Klaartje Ellemijn Veldhuijzen van Zanten. The
fourth main character is Jet's friend, a gay bookstore owner.

Miscellaneous information
The name is a pun, translating as both "without Ernst" (referring to Jet's late husband) and "without seriousness".

External links

Dutch television sitcoms
1990s Dutch television series